Pseudiragoides florianii is a species of moth of the family Limacodidae. It is found in China (Guangxi, Fujian, Hunan and Zhejiang) at altitudes between 1,200 and 2,300 meters.

The length of the forewings is 13–15 mm for males. They have a wingspan of 27–32 mm. Adults have been found from the end of April to the beginning of June.

Etymology
It is named for the Italian lepidopterist Alessandro Floriani.

References

External links 
 The Barcode of Life Data Systems (BOLD)

Limacodidae
Moths described in 2011
Moths of Asia